Larry Baptiste (born 10 August 1978) is a Sint Maartener cricketer.

A right-handed batsman and right-arm off break bowler, Baptiste was selected in Sint Maarten's squad for the 2006 Stanford 20/20, playing in their preliminary round loss to the United States Virgin Islands (USVI). Batting at number ten, Baptiste was dismissed for a single run by Sherville Huggins, while in the USVI innings he bowled two overs which conceded 16 runs, but failed to take a wicket. This marks Baptiste's only appearance in Twenty20 cricket. He has since played minor inter-island matches for Sint Maarten.

See also
List of Sint Maarten Twenty20 players

References

External links
Larry Baptiste at ESPNcricinfo
Larry Baptiste at CricketArchive

Living people
1978 births
People from Saint Andrew Parish, Grenada
Grenadian emigrants to Sint Maarten
Sint Maarten cricketers
Sint Maarten representative cricketers